Budapesti Honvéd Sport Egyesület is a Hungarian water polo club that is part of the Budapest-based multi-sports club with the same name. Founded in 1950, they won six Hungarian championships and eight Hungarian cup titles.

In 2004, beside the domestic league success the team also collected the most prestigious continental cup, the LEN Euroleague, and later triumphed over LEN Cup winners CN Barcelona with a scoreline of 10–9 to win the LEN European Supercup.

Since 1 July 2010 the club is officially known as Groupama Honvéd, following the club has agreed on a sponsorship deal with international insurance company Groupama.

Naming history
 Budapesti Honvéd Sport Egyesület (BHSE): (1949 – 1990)
 In 1990 the water polo section was defunct.
 Honvéd-Spartacus VE: (1998/99) - Merged with Budapesti Spartacus SC
 Bp. Honvéd-Domino: (1999/00 – 2000/01) - the first naming sponsor
 Domino-BHSE: (2001/02 – 2006/07)
 Domino Honvéd: (2007/08 – 2009/10)
 Groupama Honvéd: (2010/11 – 2012/13)
 RacioNet Honvéd: (2013/14 – 2017/18)
 Budapesti Honvéd SE: (2018/19 – ... )

Honours

Domestic competitions 
Országos Bajnokság I (National Championship of Hungary)
 Champions (6): 2000–01, 2001–02, 2002–03, 2003–04, 2004–05, 2005–06

Magyar Kupa (National Cup of Hungary)
 Winners (8): 1953, 1954, 1958, 1959, 1979, 1998–99, 2006, 2010

Szuperkupa (Super Cup of Hungary); Championship vs. Cup winner
 Winners: 2005

European competitions 
LEN Champions League (Euroleague)
Winners (1): 2003–04

LEN Euro Cup
Semi-finalist (1): 2010–11

LEN Cup Winners' Cup
Runners-up (1): 1980–81

LEN Super Cup
Winners (1): 2004

Current squad
Season 2020–2021

Technical staff
  Technical Director: István Vincze
  Head Coach: Márton Szívós
  Youth Coach: Imre Tóth
  Team Doctor: Antal Gábor, MD
  Physiotherapist: Tamás Klenyán

Recent seasons

 Cancelled due to the COVID-19 pandemic in Hungary.

In European competition
Participations in Champions League (Champions Cup, Euroleague): 9x
Participations in Euro Cup (LEN Cup): 3x
Participations in Cup Winners' Cup: 2x

Notable former players

Olympic champions
Gergely Kiss – 13 years (2001-2008, 2012-)  2000 Sydney, 2004 Athens, 2008 Beijing
István Gergely – 12 years (2002-2014)  2004 Athens, 2008 Beijing
István Hevesi – 8 years (1952-1960)  1956 Melbourne
Tamás Molnár – 8 years (2001-2009)  2000 Sydney, 2004 Athens, 2008 Beijing
Attila Vári – 7 years (2002-2009)  2000 Sydney, 2004 Athens
Péter Biros – 6 years (2001-2007)  2000 Sydney, 2004 Athens, 2008 Beijing
Rajmund Fodor – 6 years (2002-2008)  2000 Sydney, 2004 Athens
János Konrád – 5 years (1964-1969)  1964 Tokyo
Bulcsú Székely – 5 years (2006-2011)  2000 Sydney
Antal Bolvári – 4 years (1952-1956)  1952 Helsinki, 1956 Melbourne
György Gerendás – 4 years (1978-1982)  1976 Montreal
Barnabás Steinmetz – 4 years (2012-2016)  2000 Sydney, 2004 Athens
Tibor Benedek – 3 years (2004-2007)  2000 Sydney, 2004 Athens, 2008 Beijing
Dezső Lemhényi – 2 years (1950-1951)  1952 Helsinki
László Jeney – 2 years (1959–1960)  1952 Helsinki, 1956 Melbourne
Attila Sudár – 1 year (1982)  1976 Montreal

Former coaches

 Jenő Brandi (1950–1975)
 Kálmán Markovits (1976–1978)
 Antal Bolvári (1979–1988)

 István Kovács (1998–2008)
 Lajos Vad (2008– present)

References

External links
 

Sport in Budapest
Sports clubs established in 1950
Water polo clubs in Hungary